Digalodon is an extinct genus of kistecephalian dicynodont. For a time it was considered synonymous with other dicynodonts as a small juvenile of a larger genus, such as Aulacephalodon or Dicynodontoides, however it has since been recognised as a distinct species.

See also
 List of therapsids

References

Dicynodonts
Anomodont genera